Matt Dorsey is an American politician and communications professional. Dorsey has served on the San Francisco Board of Supervisors representing District 6 since his appointment by Mayor London Breed on May 9, 2022. He was elected to a full term in the 2022 San Francisco Board of Supervisors election. He previously served as the Head of Communications for the San Francisco Police Department.

Career 
Dorsey worked strategic communications for San Francisco City Attorney Dennis Herrera for 14 years.

Dorsey worked for the San Francisco Police Department from 2020–2022, where he served as Head of Strategic Communications. He defended the police department for its decision to withdraw from a Memorandum of Understanding (MOU) with the District Attorney's Office, which assigned the office as lead investigator in police use-of-force incidents.

San Francisco Board of Supervisors 
Dorsey was appointed to the San Francisco Board of Supervisors on May 9, 2022, by Mayor London Breed to replace outgoing District 6 Supervisor Matt Haney for the rest of his term. Unlike his predecessor, Dorsey will not represent Tenderloin, San Francisco, which was moved to District 5 after redistricting in 2022. District 6 has 76,000 San Francisco residents and consists of South of Market, Rincon Hill, South Beach, Mission Bay, Mid-Market, The Hub (near Market and Octavia) and Showplace Square (Southwestern SoMa).

Dorsey ran for election in November 2022. He defeated Honey Mahogany, a former aide to Matt Haney. Dorsey was supported by the moderate PAC, Grow SF.

Dorsey and London Breed decided to not march in San Francisco Pride 2022 after the organizers banned police officers from marching in uniform. After Pride reached a compromise with the police, Dorsey and Breed agreed to march.

Dorsey faced criticism for his support for a documentary on San Francisco's police department, which he began promoting during his time working for the police department and supported as a supervisor. Critics view the documentary as a waste of limited police resources.

Personal life 
Dorsey is gay. He is HIV-positive. Dorsey is in recovery from drug and alcohol addiction.

References 

Living people
San Francisco Board of Supervisors members
21st-century American politicians
California Democrats
LGBT people from San Francisco
American LGBT city council members
Gay politicians
Year of birth missing (living people)